Seale may refer to:

Seale, Alabama, an unincorporated community in the United States
Seale, Surrey, a village in England
Seale Hayne College, military hospital in Ivybridge, Devon, UK

Seale is also a surname:
Seale Baronets (since 1838), noble family
Charles Seale-Hayne (1833–1903), British member of Parliament from 1885 to 1903
Alvin Seale (1871–1958), American ichthyologist
Arthur Seale (born 1946), convicted murderer
Bobby Seale (born 1937), American civil rights activist
Clive Seale (born 1955), British medical sociologist
Douglas Seale (1913–1999), British actor
James Ford Seale (1936–2011), Ku Klux Klan member
John Seale (born 1942), Australian cinematographer
Patrick Seale (1930–2014), British journalist
Shonte Seale (born 1999), Barbadian netball player

See also
 Seal (disambiguation)
 Seals (disambiguation)
 Searles